The IBM 2991 Blood Cell Processor was a blood cell washer developed by IBM Systems Development Division in Endicott, New York. It was first marketed by IBM Systems Supplies Division (SSD) in 1972. The processor washed fresh blood or frozen, thawed blood. In the case of frozen, thawed blood, the blood was washed to remove the cryogenic agent, typically, glycerol.

History and development
In 1964, IBM received a grant from the National Cancer Institute (NCI) of the National Institutes of Health (NIH). This was a result of an IBM engineer, George T. Judson, requesting to work on a continuous-flow blood centrifuge. He had observed the need for such a machine when visiting NCI in 1962 after his son was diagnosed with leukemia. As a result of this work, IBM developed the NCI-IBM Blood Cell Separator which was announced in 1965. At that announcement, Judson and his co-worker Alan Jones were approached by Dr. James R. Pert, Director of the American Red Cross Blood Research program in Washington, D.C. He told them of the need for a machine to separate packed red cells from glycerol. The glycerol is added to the red cells to protect the cells during freezing. The processor was announced in September 1972 at the American Association of Blood Banks (AABB) in Washington, D.C.

Up until the 1970s, SSD had been at the heart of IBM, for it had produced the millions of punch cards that had been extremely profitable for IBM for more than four decades. By the 1970s business was declining, as IBM's concentration increasingly turned to computing. Accordingly, the vice president in charge of SSD, Everett "Van" Van Hoesen, avidly searched for any new business that could be slotted into SSD. So SSD, an otherwise dying division, became a hotbed of innovation.

Searching for these new products Van started a campaign to win the first (2991) product 'mission', though SSD did not have any significant history of machine production. One key factor, though, was that the products being tendered for also comprised a substantial element of on-going income from the related supplies. In the case of the blood products the annual supplies income could easily run at a rate approaching the capital value of the machine. It was a situation that was familiar to SSD, brought up on the similar philosophy inherent in the punched card business. Van won the mission, probably due to his enthusiasm; and assisted by the fact that the business was much less attractive to other plants.

SSD subsequently added the IBM 2997 Blood Cell Separator and the IBM 5880 ECG System to its line of products.

Methodology
The machine works by spinning a unit of blood in its centrifuge with various concentrations of saline solution.  The machine spins the red cells in a circular bag and then uses a hydraulic system to express out saline, plasma, glycerol used in the freezing process, and unwanted plasma proteins.

The blood is washed in a special, single-use washing kit with a circular bag and five tubing lines branching from a central tube from the circular bag.  These lines are inserted into the unit of blood to be processed, saline solutions, or an attached waste bag.  The washed blood can be labeled in the circular bag or transferred into a more traditionally shaped blood storage bag.  Because the washing process creates an open system, red blood cells washed with this machine expire after 24 hours when kept at 1-6 °C.

Current use
The IBM 2991 is still in use today in many blood banks for washing red blood cell units.  The machine is now manufactured and supported by Terumo BCT and sold as the COBE® 2991 cell Processor.

Blood
2991